Elvis Martínez may refer to:
 Elvis Martínez (footballer)
 Elvis Martínez (singer)